'Thomas Chippenham (fl. 1420–1431) of Hereford was an English politician.

He was Mayor of Hereford for 1420–21 and elected a member (MP) of the Parliament of England for Hereford in 1420, 1426, 1429 and 
1431.

References

Year of birth missing
15th-century deaths
English MPs 1420
Mayors of Hereford
English MPs 1426
English MPs 1429
English MPs 1431